The 1724 papal conclave was called upon the death of Pope Innocent XIII. It began on 20 March 1724 and ended on 28 May that year with the election of Cardinal Vincenzo Maria Orsini, a Dominican friar, as Pope Benedict XIII. The conclave was made of largely the same electors that had elected Innocent in 1721 and the same factions dominated it. Multiple attempts were made to elect candidates that would be acceptable to the various Catholic monarchies at the time, but none were successful until May. Benedict resisted his own election for two days before being convinced to accept it.

Background
The papal conclave that had elected Innocent XIII in 1721 was dominated by cardinals appointed by Clement XI, who had been Pope for 21 years and appointed over 70 cardinals during that time. The conclave that elected Innocent was marked by a new alliance between the French and Spanish cardinals due to a change in the Spanish dynasty following the War of the Spanish Succession that resulted in Philip V, a Bourbon and the grandson of Louis XIV of France, ascending to what had previously been a Habsburg throne. Innocent was elected unanimously with the prospect that he might cooperate with both Bourbon France and the Hapsburg Holy Roman Emperor. Innocent had been in poor health for the year before his death on 7 March 1724 and preparations for the conclave to elect his successor had begun before his death.

Conclave
During his pontificate Innocent XIII had only created three new cardinals. When he died the composition of the College of Cardinals and its factions were similar to the one that had elected him. The conclave began on 20 March 1724 with only 33 cardinal electors present, but eventually 53 total cardinals took part in the election.

At the start of the conclave, electors from the zelanti faction attempted to elect Giuseppe Renato Imperiali, but this was not possible because of his unpopularity with both France and Spain. Following this attempt cardinals representing the Bourbons insisted that no serious attempt to elect a new pope take place until all cardinals who were traveling had arrived, and until the electors had received instructions from the various Catholic monarchs.

Annibale Albani, the brother of Clement XI, tried to elect Fabrizio Paolucci as Pope, having supported him previously in 1721. The Hapsburg emperor,  Charles VI, was opposed to Paolucci because he was sympathetic to the Bourbons, and a papal veto from Charles arrived from Vienna before Paolucci could be elected. Several of the electors continued to vote for Paolucci after he was excluded in protest of the veto. Representatives of England attempted to influence the conclave in order to reduce the honours that had been given in Rome to members of the House of Stuart, but their influence was limited because Giulio Alberoni, who had agreed to help them, did not have significant influence at the conclave.

Charles VI had instructed his representative to the papal court Maximilian Ulrich von Kaunitz to work closely with Álvaro Cienfuegos to elect a candidate that he favoured. Cuenfuego's instructions were that cardinals Pamfili, Vallemani, Spada, Piazza, Corradini, Caracciolo, Tanara, Orsini, Ruffo, Colonna, Davia, Boncompagni, Pico, and Pignatelli would be acceptable to the emperor, and that cardinals Paolucci, Olivieri, Bussi, Sagripanti, and Origo were to be excluded.

Cienfuegos led electors that were part of the imperial party in an attempt to elect Giulio Piazza. Piazza was almost elected on May 13, but was short by four votes. The electors were confident that they would be able to elect him, because more cardinals were arriving to participate in the conclave, and it became public in Rome that Piazza was likely to be the new pope. Albani did not support this because he had not been a part of the negotiations despite being the original elector to suggest Piazza, and undermined his election by proposing Vincenzo Orsini as an alternate candidate.

Election of Benedict XIII
On 28 May the conclave unanimously elected Orsini as Pope. He had not been seen as a serious candidate in past conclaves because he did not have political experience. Orsini was 75 at the time, and it took the cardinals two days to convince him to accept his election. He was recorded to have spent the night before his election sleepless and in tears. Even when the cardinals had taken him into the Sistine Chapel for the formal vote to elect him pope after they had been convinced he would accept, he was still unwilling to accept his own election. Ultimately, he only accepted it after being convinced of it by Agustín Pipia the Master of the Dominican Order, of which he was a member. Upon accepting his election, he attempted to take the name Benedict XIV, which would have recognized Antipope Benedict XIII, the last Avignon Pope during the Western Schism. Lawyers from the Roman Curia eventually persuaded Orisini to take the name Benedict XIII.

Orisini's election was notable at the time because it was unusual for the cardinals to elect friars, since they were seen by some as too rigid. Members of religious orders at the time were often respected by the cardinals, but rarely elected, with Benedict XIII being only the fourth since the Council of Trent. Unlike the other mendicants elected to the papacy in this period, he was of noble birth, being the eldest son of the Duke of Gravina, but had forfeited his rights to his father's title in order to enter the Dominicans.

Notes

References

1724 in the Papal States
1724 in politics
1724
1724 in Europe
18th-century Catholicism
1724 in Christianity
18th-century elections in Europe
Pope Benedict XIII